Jamahiriya is an Arabic word that is difficult to translate but is most commonly expressed in English as "State of the masses" or "People's republic". It may also refer to:
 a concept in the Political philosophy of Muammar Gaddafi
 the Great Socialist People's Libyan Arab Jamahiriya ruled by Gaddafi (1977–2011)
 a Savage Republic album, see Jamahiriya Democratique et Populaire de Sauvage

See also
History of Libya under Muammar Gaddafi
Libyan Civil War
Jamahiriya TV was the name of Libyan state television
Jumhuriya (disambiguation)